John Peter Haines was President of the American Society for the Prevention of Cruelty to Animals (ASPCA) from 1889 to 1906.

Biography 
John Peter Haines was born in Manhattan, New York on December 17, 1851, the son of William Augustus Haines and Emily Somers (Stagg) Haines. He had three siblings by the names of  William Augustus Haines Jr. (1846–1912), Richard Townley Haines (1855–1896), and Emily Somers Haines Jr. (1858–1928). He was educated by private tutors and at Columbia University.

He married Mary Merritt in 1873.

He died at his home in Toms River, New Jersey on June 27, 1921.

Haines and Topsy 
John Peter Haines was the President of the American Society for the Prevention of Cruelty to Animals (ASPCA) from 1889 to 1906. In 1903 he stopped the owners of the Coney Island Luna Park from conducting a public hanging of an elephant named Topsy saying it was needlessly cruel and animal deaths should not be a public spectacle. Instead, he agreed to a more private affair that included poisoned carrots with cyanide, electrocution, then afterwards strangulation with a winch.

References

External links 
 

1851 births
1921 deaths
Activists from New York City
American animal welfare workers
Columbia University alumni
People from Manhattan